PAOK Football Club (Πανθεσσαλονίκειος Αθλητικός Όμιλος Κωνσταντινοπολιτών, Panthessaloníkios Athlitikós Ómilos Konstantinopolitón, "Pan-Thessalonian Athletic Club of Constantinopolitans"), commonly known as PAOK Thessaloniki or PAOK, is a professional football club based in Thessaloniki, Macedonia, Greece. Established on 20 April 1926 by Greek refugees who fled to Thessaloniki from Constantinople in the wake of the Greco-Turkish War (1919–1922), they play their home games at Toumba Stadium, with a capacity of 29,000 seats.

Honours

Domestic 
Super League
Winners (3): 1975–76, 1984–85, 2018–19
Greek Cup
Winners (8): 1971–72, 1973–74, 2000–01, 2002–03, 2016–17, 2017–18, 2018–19, 2020–21
Double
Winners (1): 2018–19
Greater Greece Cup
Winners (1): 1973

European 
UEFA Champions League
 Last 16 (1): 1976–77
 UEFA Cup Winners' Cup:
 Quarter-finalists (1): 1973–74
 UEFA Europa League:
 Last 32 (11): 1982–83, 1983–84, 1991–92, 1997–98, 2000–01, 2001–02, 2002–03, 2010–11, 2011–12, 2013–14, 2016–17
 UEFA Europa Conference League
 Quarter-finalists (1): 2021–22

Regional 
Macedonia FCA Championship:
Winners (7): 1936–37, 1947–48, 1949–50, 1953–54, 1954–55, 1955–56, 1956–57
Macedonia-Thrace FCA Championship:
Winners (1): 1939–40

Player records

Appearances 
Most appearances in all competitions: Giorgos Koudas, 607.
Most league appearances: Giorgos Koudas, 504.
Most Greek Cup appearances: Giorgos Koudas, 70.
Most Greek Cup final appearances: Giorgos Koudas, 9.
Most Continental appearances: Dimitris Salpingidis, 60.
Youngest debutant: Apostolos Tsourelas, 16 years, 6 months and 18 days.
Oldest first-team player: Kostas Chalkias, 37 years, 11 months and 17 days.  
Most consecutive league appearances: Nikos Michopoulos, 107. 
Longest-serving player: Giorgos Koudas, 20 years, 2 months and 6 days.
{| cellpadding=8
|-
|valign="bottom"|Most league appearances:

Goalscorers 

Most goals in all competitions: Stavros Sarafis, 169.
Most league goals: Stavros Sarafis, 136.
Most Greek Cup goals: Giorgos Koudas, 27.
Most Continental goals: Stefanos Athanasiadis, 20.
First player to score for PAOK:
Most goals in a season: Aleksandar Prijović, 27 (during the 2017–18 season).
Most goals in a debut season:
Most league goals in a season: Aleksandar Prijović, 19 (during the 2017–18 Superleague Greece).
Most continental goals in a season: Robert Mak, 9 (during the 2015–16 season).
Most hat-tricks / four-goal hauls in a season: Giorgos Kostikos, 1 hat-trick and 2 four-goal hauls (during the 1981–82 season). 
Most games scored in a single campaign:
Most hat-tricks: Stavros Sarafis and Giorgos Kostikos, 4. 
Fastest hat-trick: Giorgos Kostikos, 15 minutes, (Panachaiki – PAOK 0–3, 9 December 1984).
Most penalties scored: Giorgos Skartados, 27.
Most games without scoring for an outfield player:
Youngest goalscorer: Stefanos Tzimas, 17 years, 1 month and 27 days.
Oldest goalscorer:

Top goalscorers 

League top goalscorers:

Goalkeepers 

Most minutes without conceding a goal: Alexandros Paschalakis, 971 (if stoppage time is included, 1008).
Most clean sheets:
Most clean sheets in a season:
Most penalties saved: Nikos Michopoulos, 7.
Most penalties saved in a season:

Managerial records 

 First manager: Kostas Andreadis (served for 5 years).
 Longest-serving manager by time (1959–present): Les Shannon, from 21 January 1971 to 10 October 1974 (3 years, 8 months and 20 days).
 Shortest-serving manager: Mario Beretta, from June 14 to July 22, 2010 (38 days).
 Longest-serving manager by matches: Angelos Anastasiadis, 213.
 Most wins: Angelos Anastasiadis, 120.
 Highest winning percentage: Răzvan Lucescu, 74.2%.
 Most trophies: Răzvan Lucescu, 3 (1 Championship, 2 Cups).

Club records

Matches

Firsts 

 First match: (friendly) PAOK – Megas Alexandros Thessaloniki 2–1, 4 May 1926.
 First official match: (EPSM) PAOK – Nea Genea Kalamaria 3–1, 12 December 1926.
 First Panhellenic Championship (1928–1959) match: Olympiacos – PAOK 3–1, 1 February 1931.
 First league match: PAOK – Megas Alexandros Katerini 3–2, 25 October 1959.
 First Greek Cup match: PAOK – Meliteas 3–0, 27 September 1931.
 First European match:
(Inter-Cities Fairs Cup) PAOK – Wiener 2–1, 15 September 1965.
(UEFA Cup Winners' Cup) Rapid Wien – PAOK 0–0, 13 September 1972.

Wins 

 Record Panhellenic Championship (1928–1959) win: PAOK – Panetolikos 7–1, 18 May 1955.
 Record league win:
(Home) PAOK – Kastoria 7–1, 22 December 1974 and PAOK – Kalamata 7–1, 28 January 2001.
(Away) Atromitos – PAOK 1–6, 24 October 1976.
 Record Greek Cup win:
(Home) PAOK – Atlantis Thessaloniki 11–0, 18 October 1959.
(Away) Lamia – PAOK 1–9, 20 February 1985.
 Record European win:
(Away) Locomotive Tbilisi – PAOK 0–7, UEFA Cup, 16 September 1999.
(Home) PAOK – Lokomotiva Zagreb 6–0, UEFA Europa League, 23 July 2015.
 Most league wins in a season:
 27 wins from 34 games (during the 1972–73 Alpha Ethniki).
 26 wins from 30 games (during the 2018–19 Superleague Greece).
 Fewest league wins in a season: 7 wins from 30 games (during the 1960–61 Alpha Ethniki).
 Most consecutive wins: 15 (during the 2017–18 PAOK FC season).
 Most consecutive league wins: 10 (during the 2017–18 Superleague Greece).
 Most consecutive league wins from start of season: 8 (during the 2018–19 Superleague Greece).

Defeats 
 Record Panhellenic Championship (1928–1959) defeat: Panathinaikos – PAOK 7–1, 28 June 1931.
 Record league defeat: Olympiacos – PAOK 6–0, 3 June 1962.
 Record Greek Cup defeat: 4–0 on 5 occasions, vs Olympiacos (1951 and 1975), vs AEK (1965 and 2002) and vs PAS Giannina (2010)
 Record European defeat:
(Inter-Cities Fairs Cup) Wiener – PAOK 6–0, 28 September 1965.
(UEFA Cup) Barcelona – PAOK 6–1, 1 October 1975.
 Record European defeat at Toumba: (UEFA Champions League) PAOK – Benfica 1–4, 29 August 2018.
 Most league defeats in a season: 15 in 30 matches (during the 2007–08 Superleague Greece).
 Fewest league defeats in a season: Unbeaten in 30 matches (during the 2018–19 Superleague Greece).
 Most consecutive undefeated league games: 51 (11 March 2018 – 4 January 2020).
 Most consecutive defeats:

Goals 
 Highest goals scored per game average in a season: 2.19 (during the 1972–73 season).
 Most goals scored in a season: 109 in 61 games (during the 2013–14 season).
 Most league goals scored in a season: 75 in 34 games (during the 1972–73 Alpha Ethniki).
 Fewest league goals scored in a season: 22 in 30 games (during the 1963–64 Alpha Ethniki).
 Most league goals conceded in a season: 49 in 30 games (during the 1965–66 Alpha Ethniki).
 Fewest league goals conceded in a season: 14 in 30 games (during the 2018–19 Superleague Greece).
 Fewest league goals conceded at home in a season: 3 in 17 games (during the 1994–95 Alpha Ethniki).
 Most consecutive league games scoring: 69 (PAOK lost two home games 0–3 by court decision during this period that are not taken into account).
 Most consecutive league games scoring away: 35.

Points 
 Most points in a season:
 Point system (3–2–1): 92 (in 34 matches in 1972–73 Alpha Ethniki).
 Point system (2–1–0): 49 (in 30 matches in 1975–76 Alpha Ethniki) and 52 (in 34 matches in 1976–77 Alpha Ethniki).
 Point system (3–1–0): 82 (in 30 matches in 2018–19 Superleague Greece).

 Fewest points in a season:
 Point system (3–2–1): 57 (in 30 matches in 1963–64 Alpha Ethniki).
 Point system (2–1–0): 27 (in 30 matches in 1985–86 Alpha Ethniki).
 Point system (3–1–0): 35 (in 30 matches in 2007–08 Superleague Greece).

Attendances 

 Highest league home attendance: 45,252 (0–0 against AEK, 19 December 1976).
 Highest Greek Cup home attendance: 44,045 (2–1 against AEK, 9 February 1977).
 Highest European home attendance: 45,200 (1–0 against Barcelona, UEFA Cup, 16 September 1975).
 Lowest league home attendance: 381 (1–0 against Athinaikos, 30 May 1993).
 Lowest Greek Cup home attendance:
 Lowest European home attendance: 1,012 (5–1 against Rennes, UEFA Cup, 14 December 2005).

Domestic records

European record 

Last updated: 28 July 2022

References

External links